Elizabeth Hargrave is an American game designer. She has designed several games, including Wingspan, which won the 2019 Kennerspiel des Jahres for best connoisseur game of the year, Tussie-Mussie and Mariposas.

Biography
Hargrave grew up in Florida, with her father being a biochemist. Growing up, she played games with her family, particularly Scrabble and hearts, and played gin rummy in high school. 

In 1994, Hargrave graduated from Brown University. She went on to earn her Master's in Public Affairs from the Lyndon B. Johnson School of Public Affairs.

After earning a master’s degree in public affairs, Hargrave worked for many years in Washington, DC, first at the Department of Health and Human Services and later as a public policy analyst at the University of Chicago's National Opinion Research Center. Her policy research included prescription drug policy, and work on a report to the U.S. Congress by the Medicare Payment Advisory Commission. Hargrave was featured in a US News Money article discussing the U.S. 2012 Medicare Part D Plan.

She travelled to Belize in 2019 to volunteer her time supporting research scientists who track shark and stingray populations. She assisted with the catching, tagging and measurement of stingrays and sharks.

Described by the New York Times as "a spreadsheet geek," Hargrave lives in Silver Spring, Maryland with her husband, landscape designer Matt Cohen.

Game design
Hargrave meets regularly with others from the Washington, DC area to play board games. She got the idea to start designing games based on themes from nature in 2014 at one such event, according to Audubon:Hargrave and her husband loved nature, and had recently started birding. All their friends were similarly outdoorsy. “Why,” she posed to the group, “are there no games about things we are into?”

To another interviewer, Hargrave explained she felt "... there were too many games about castles and space, and not enough games about things I’m interested in. So I decided to make a game about something I cared about."

Hargrave designed Wingspan using online data from the Cornell Lab of Ornithology and from the National Audubon Society. She describes the game as "a card-based engine-building game about bringing birds into a nature preserve." 

Hargrave pitched the game (then called "Bring in the Birds") to three different publishers at Gen Con in 2016; it was bought by Stonemaier Games. Published in 2019, the game sold 44,000 copies worldwide over three printings in its first two months of release, with the publisher issuing a public apology for not having more copies available. Wingspan received critical acclaim for its theme, component quality, accessibility and gameplay. It also won the 2019 Kennerspiel des Jahres for best connoisseur game of the year.

Hargrave created the game Tussie Mussie in 2018 during the month leading up to the 2018 Game Design contest of Gen Can't (an online conference initially created as a joking alternative for people who can't attend Gen Con.) Each game card shows a different flower, together with text describing its secret meaning in the Victorian "language of flowers." After winning the Gen Can't contest, the game was published in 2019 by Button Shy Games, funded by a Kickstarter campaign with a $1000 goal that instead brought in more than $80,000. 

Hargrave's began work on Mariposas (Spanish for "butterflies"), a game about migrating monarch butterflies in 2018, and sold it to game publisher Alderac Entertainment Group (AEG), who had put out a call for women game designers, in 2019, just before Wingspan was published. Hargrave told an interviewer the project was inspired partly by visiting a Mexican butterfly sanctuary in 2003 and partly by reading Barbara Kingsolver's 2012 novel Flight Behavior. It was published in 2020 and was described as family-friendly game aimed at a broader audience than Wingspan. The game's components and its environmental message also earned praise.

Hargrave is also working on games about mushrooms and the genetics of dog-fox hybrids.

References

American game designers
Living people
Year of birth missing (living people)